Michael Ninn is an adult film director and writer. He began his career as a music video director and made his first adult films in 1992.

Adult film career 
In 1992 Ninn made his first adult erotic films – Black Orchid,  Principles of Lust and Two Sisters. The next year he signed with VCA Pictures and went on to produce a series of award-winning films, including Sex, Latex and  Shock.

Ninn's production company, Ninn Worx, has produced dozens of films that have won more than 70 AVN Awards. In 1997, Shock won eleven awards, including "Best Director" and "Best Video Feature". In 2005, the Ninn Worx film Fetish Circus won the 2005 AVN award for "Best DVD", and Lost Angels: Katsumi won "Best Foreign All-Sex Release".  In 2006, Ninn won the AVN Award for "Best Director - Non Feature" for the film Neo Pornographia.

In 2006, Eddie Van Halen contributed to the soundtrack of Ninn's film Sacred Sin.

In 2013 Ninn received an XBIZ Award nomination for "Director of the Year - Feature Release" for The Four. He also was nominated for seven AVN Awards in 2013 for The Four.

Awards

References

External links
 .
 .
 .
 Michael Ninn at the Adult Film Database.
 Michael Ninn - NINN WORX.

 .
 .
 .

American pornographic film directors
Fashion photographers
Living people
1950s births
Year of birth uncertain